Burn is the third studio album by American country music artist Jo Dee Messina, released in August 2000 by Curb Records.

Her first No. 1 Billboard album on the Top Country Albums charts, it also hit No. 19 on the Billboard 200. "That's the Way" served as the album's lead-off single, spending four weeks at the top of the Billboard country music charts and becoming a major pop hit, peaking at #25.  "Closer" was supposed to be the first single but was switched last minute (they filmed a video for it and it's included on her DVD video collection).  Following it was the title track (previously recorded by Tina Arena on her album In Deep) which became a #2 hit on the country music charts and Top 20 hit on the Hot Adult Contemporary Tracks, it gave Messina her first entry on the latter charts. "Downtime" peaked at #5 on the country music charts, followed by another Number One in the Tim McGraw duet "Bring on the Rain". Finally, "Dare to Dream" peaked at #23 in mid-2002. The album has sold over one million copies and was certified Platinum.

Track listing

Personnel
Jo Dee Messina - lead vocals
Lisa Bevill - backing vocals (tracks 8,10)
Mike Brignardello - bass guitar
Larry Byrom - acoustic guitar (tracks 1,4,5,8-10)
Steve Conn - accordion on “These Are the Days”
Paul Franklin - dobro, steel guitar
Ralph Friedrichson - backing vocals (track 9)
Byron Gallimore - 12-string electric guitar on “These Are the Days”
Aubrey Haynie - fiddle, mandolin, octave fiddle on “These Are the Days”
Kirk “Jelly Roll” Johnson - harmonica on “These Are the Days”
Michael Landau - electric guitar
B. James Lowry - electric guitar
Brent Mason - electric guitar
Tim McGraw - vocals on "Bring On the Rain"
Gene Miller - backing vocals (tracks 8,10)
Steve Nathan - keyboards
Kim Parent - backing vocals (tracks 1-7,9)
Chris Rodriguez - backing vocals (tracks 2,3,6,7)
John Wesley Ryles - backing vocals (tracks 1,5)
Biff Watson - acoustic guitar (tracks 2,3,7)
John Willis - acoustic guitar (tracks 6,11)
Lonnie Wilson - drums
Curtis Young - backing vocals (track 4)

Charts

Weekly charts

Year-end charts

Singles

References

2000 albums
Jo Dee Messina albums
Curb Records albums
Albums produced by Byron Gallimore
Albums produced by Tim McGraw